Paul Öpik (22 January 1888 Tallinn – 23 April 1967 Tallinn) was an Estonian politician. He was a member of I Riigikogu. He was a member of the parliament (Riigikogu) from 29 November 1922. He replaced Rudolf Paabo. On 25 January 1923, he resigned his position and he was replaced by Karl Mikita.

References

1888 births
1967 deaths
Members of the Riigikogu, 1920–1923
Politicians from Tallinn